Mieke ("Mickey") Suys (born 15 February 1968 in Ghent) is an athlete from Belgium who competes in triathlon. Suys competed at the first Olympic triathlon at the 2000 Summer Olympics.  She did not finish the competition.

Four years later, at the 2004 Summer Olympics, Suys competed again.  Her time of 2:09:12.57 placed her twenty-second in the event.

References
 Profile

1968 births
Living people
Belgian female triathletes
Olympic triathletes of Belgium
Triathletes at the 2000 Summer Olympics
Triathletes at the 2004 Summer Olympics
Sportspeople from Ghent